Cockle Bay is an eastern suburb of Auckland, New Zealand. The suburb is in the Howick ward, one of the 13 administrative divisions of Auckland city and currently under governance of the Auckland Council. The high school of the area is Howick College, a decile 8 school of the Howick area. The primary schools of the area are Cockle Bay School and Shelly Park Primary School.

History

Tuwakamana is original name for Cockle Bay, it is  an abbreviated form of Te Tauranga Waka a Manawatere (the landing place of Manawatere). Both the headland Pā and the beach below carry the name Tuwakamana. The Pā and its associated cultivations were settled by Manawatere's Ngāi Tai followers, upon their arrival in the area soon after him aboard the Tainui Waka. Over time later generations constructed the fortifications of the Pā around the 1600s.

Demographics

Cockle Bay had a population of 4,224 at the 2018 New Zealand census, an increase of 144 people (3.5%) since the 2013 census, and an increase of 108 people (2.6%) since the 2006 census. There were 1,452 households, comprising 2,100 males and 2,124 females, giving a sex ratio of 0.99 males per female. The median age was 43.6 years (compared with 37.4 years nationally), with 777 people (18.4%) aged under 15 years, 723 (17.1%) aged 15 to 29, 1,974 (46.7%) aged 30 to 64, and 750 (17.8%) aged 65 or older.

Ethnicities were 83.0% European/Pākehā, 5.4% Māori, 2.1% Pacific peoples, 14.1% Asian, and 2.2% other ethnicities. People may identify with more than one ethnicity.

The percentage of people born overseas was 39.5, compared with 27.1% nationally.

Although some people chose not to answer the census's question about religious affiliation, 47.7% had no religion, 41.6% were Christian, 0.1% had Māori religious beliefs, 1.0% were Hindu, 0.7% were Muslim, 1.2% were Buddhist and 2.1% had other religions.

Of those at least 15 years old, 1,071 (31.1%) people had a bachelor's or higher degree, and 294 (8.5%) people had no formal qualifications. The median income was $42,900, compared with $31,800 nationally. 1,050 people (30.5%) earned over $70,000 compared to 17.2% nationally. The employment status of those at least 15 was that 1,758 (51.0%) people were employed full-time, 588 (17.1%) were part-time, and 69 (2.0%) were unemployed.

Education

References

External links
Photographs of Cockle Bay held in Auckland Libraries' heritage collections.

Suburbs of Auckland
Bays of the Auckland Region
Beaches of the Auckland Region
Populated places around the Hauraki Gulf / Tīkapa Moana
Howick Local Board Area